Liquid X is a brand of energy drink originally developed in Amsterdam for the rave scene. Liquid X has a citrus taste that can be related to the taste of Mountain Dew AMP.

Energy Ingredients
Damiana Extract - 40 mg
Horny Goat Weed Extract (also known as an Epimedium plant) - 30 mg
Ginseng Extract - 25 mg
Yohimbe Extract - 25 mg
Taurine - 600 mg

Flavors
Regular
Sugar-Free (Coming Soon)
DrinkLiquidX.com

References
Reviews 
Ingredients 
Website: https://drinkliquidx.com/

Energy drinks
Food and drink introduced in 2001